Vincent Fournier may refer to:

Vincent Fournier (footballer) (born 1961), Swiss football defender
Vincent Fournier (photographer) (born 1970), French artist photographer
 Alice Cooper, the stage name of Vincent Damon Furnier